The Nissan Frontier is a nameplate used on two different pickup truck models by Nissan:
 Nissan Frontier (international), an alternative nameplate for the NP300/Navara on some markets
 Nissan Frontier (North America), a rebadged NP300/Navara from 1997 to 2021, then became a separate model since 2021

Frontier